WPD may refer to:
Working Parents Day
Police
 Waterloo Police Department (Iowa), United States
 Wichita Police Department, Kansas, United States
 Western Police District, former name of the Manila Police District

Other uses
 Waurn Ponds railway station, in Victoria, Australia
 Wavelet packet decomposition, a signal processing model
 WebPlatform Docs, a Web standards collaboration
 Western Power Distribution, an electricity distributor in the UK
 World Poetry Day
 World Prematurity Day
 .wpd, a file name extension for WordPerfect word processing documents